Mbowe may be,

Mbowe language

People
Freeman Mbowe
Khalila Mbowe